Woodland is a village in Belmont Township, Iroquois County, Illinois, United States. The population was 324 as of the 2010 census.

Geography
Woodland is located in east-central Iroquois County at  (40.713892, -87.730535).

Sugar Creek, a tributary of the Iroquois River, flows northward past the west side of the village.

Demographics

As of the census of 2000, there were 319 people, 124 households, and 91 families residing in the village. The racial makeup of the village was 94.36% White, 2.51% African American, 1.88% from other races, and 1.25% from two or more races. Hispanic or Latino of any race were 4.39% of the population.

There were 124 households, out of which 37.9% had children under the age of 18 living with them, 54.8% were married couples living together, 12.1% had a female householder with no husband present, and 26.6% were non-families. 25.0% of all households were made up of individuals, and 12.9% had someone living alone who was 65 years of age or older.  The average household size was 2.57 and the average family size was 2.98.

In the village, the population was spread out, with 30.7% under the age of 18, 5.6% from 18 to 24, 28.8% from 25 to 44, 23.8% from 45 to 64, and 11.0% who were 65 years of age or older.  The median age was 37 years. For every 100 females, there were 93.3 males.  For every 100 females age 18 and over, there were 85.7 males.

The median income for a household in the village was $32,115, and the median income for a family was $35,000. Males had a median income of $33,750 versus $16,750 for females. The per capita income for the village was $14,707.  About 17.0% of families and 21.2% of the population were below the poverty line, including 34.0% of those under age 18 and 23.1% of those age 65 or over.

References

Villages in Iroquois County, Illinois
Villages in Illinois